HXC Recordings (also known as Hot Charity) was an independent record label, distributed by British record company, Beggars Group through XL Recordings.

History
The label was launched in 2012 by photographer and filmmaker Jamie-James Medina. The label's first signing was Chicago outsider artist Willis Earl Beal, releasing his debut album Acousmatic Sorcery on April 2, 2012.

Catalogue artists
 Duane The Teenage Weirdo
 Okay Kaya
 RATKING
 Single Mothers
 Willis Earl Beal

Discography
Albums / EPs
 Willis Earl Beal "Acousmatic Sorcery" (2012)
 RATKING "Wiki93" (2012)
 Willis Earl Beal "Nobody knows." (2013)
 RATKING "So It Goes" (2014)
 Single Mothers "Negative Qualities" (2014)
 RATKING "700-Fill" (2015)

See also
 List of record labels
 List of electronic music record labels
 List of independent UK record labels

References

External links
 

Record labels established in 2012
Alternative rock record labels
American independent record labels
Indie rock record labels
Beggars Group